Mandias may refer to:

Mantle (vesture)
Mandias, a fictional House Corrino emperor in the Dune universe